Phebe Edwards (born 9 June) is an English singer and songwriter. She has appeared as a studio backing vocalist for a number of artists such as Stormzy, Craig David, London Grammar, 
Michael Kiwanuka, Donna Summer and Leona Lewis. In 2006 she sang alongside James Brown at the BBC Electric Proms. She has supported artists like Adele, Liam Gallagher, Bryan Ferry, Louisa Johnson, and  Gabrielle. and has toured with Jessie J and Years & Years.

Discography

Studio albums

Singles

As lead artist

Selected Background Vocals

References 

English soul singers
Year of birth missing (living people)
Living people
21st-century Black British women singers
English women singer-songwriters
21st-century English women singers
21st-century English singers